The Calhoun County School District is a public school district based in Pittsboro, Mississippi (USA). The district's boundaries parallel that of Calhoun County.

Schools
Bruce High School
Calhoun City High School
Vardaman High School
Bruce Upper Elementary School
Bruce Elementary School
Calhoun City Elementary School
Vardaman Elementary School

Demographics

2006–07 school year
There were a total of 2,641 students enrolled in the Calhoun County School District during the 2006–2007 school year. The gender makeup of the district was 49% female and 51% male. The racial makeup of the district was 38.66% African American, 54.41% White, 6.74% Hispanic, 0.15% Asian, and 0.03% Native American. 61.4% of the district's students were eligible to receive free lunch.

Previous school years

Accountability statistics

See also
List of school districts in Mississippi

References

External links

 

Education in Calhoun County, Mississippi
School districts in Mississippi